

	

The Liaquat–Nehru Pact (or the Delhi Pact) was a bilateral treaty between India and Pakistan in which refugees were allowed to return to dispose of their property, abducted women and looted property were to be returned, forced conversions were unrecognized, and minority rights were confirmed.

The treaty was signed in New Delhi by the Prime Minister of India Jawahar Lal Nehru and the Prime Minister of Pakistan Liaquat Ali Khan on April 8, 1950. The treaty was the outcome of six days of talks sought to guarantee the rights of minorities in both countries after the Partition of India and to avert another war between them.

This pact also introduced visa system for refugees and free passage of refugees across border was restricted.

Minority commissions were set up in both countries. More than one million refugees migrated from East Pakistan (now Bangladesh) to West Bengal in India.

See also 
 List of treaties

References

Further reading

External links 
 Nehru-Liaquat Delhi Pact 1950

Treaties of the Dominion of Pakistan
India–Pakistan relations
1950 in India
Treaties concluded in 1950
1950 in Pakistan
Bilateral treaties of India
Partition of India
India–Pakistan treaties
Nehru administration
Government of Liaquat Ali Khan